Christopher Ries (born 1952) is an American glass artist and sculptor. Ries is noted for applying classical sculptural reduction to cold optical crystal rather than using traditional hot techniques such as blowing or molding. He refined his skills during the height of American studio glass movement under the mentorship of its principal founder, Harvey Littleton.

Ries's work includes the largest non-assembled glass forms in existence, and is collected in museums worldwide.

Biography

Early life
Christopher Ries was born to florists Raymond and Mildred Ries and was raised in a log cabin on a farm near Columbus, Ohio. As a young adult he expressed an interest in art and ceramics. Throughout high school he produced pottery in a makeshift studio in his parents’ root cellar.

In 1971 he matriculated to The Ohio State University to pursue a Bachelor of Fine Arts degree in ceramics. He soon became more interested in the glass used to glaze pottery than the pottery itself. In order to explore glass as a medium for artistic expression, he built what became The Ohio State University's first glass studio and served as its first instructor. Ries spent the next several years blowing glass and investigating glass types, chemical compositions, and properties.

During his senior year at The Ohio State University, Ries attended a guest lecture given by Harvey Littleton. Littleton was struck by Ries's accomplishments as both a glass artist and teacher, and asked Ries to become his research assistant at the University of Wisconsin–Madison. Ries accepted the offer and enrolled at the institute the following autumn.

Ries spent the next two years under the mentorship of Littleton. Ries's interest in glass's optical properties grew, and began carving cold glass instead of blowing hot glass. Tools to sculpt large blocks of glass weren't available at the time, so Ries independently developed much of the equipment he needed during his spare time. He graduated the University of Wisconsin–Madison in 1978 with a master's degree in fine arts and returned to Columbus.

He lives with four of his children, Banks, Chase, Catherine and Caroline.

Career
After graduating the University of Wisconsin–Madison, Ries spent several years searching for the ideal glass to be used in sculpture. Ries's search ended when he discovered the lead crystal manufactured by Schott Optical (now Schott North America). For the next two years he regularly travelled to Duryea, Pennsylvania, to purchase pieces of cullet from Schott. He would then sculpt, carve, and polish these pieces in his studio in Columbus.

As Ries's technique developed, Dr. Franz Herkt, president of Schott Optical, invited Ries to work with the company as an independent contractor with the title Artist in Residence. Ries accepted the distinction and in 1986 signed an agreement which allowed him to work within the Duryea facility. He created a body of work which Schott and Ries co-produced and co-owned.

Ries also established a private studio in Tunkhannock, Pennsylvania, which he has used to explore concepts in glass and occasionally other media including wood and paint. Most of the masterworks Ries produced at the Schott facility were modeled after forms created at his private studio.

Ries's relationship with Schott continued until a fire destroyed his on-site studio on 3 March 2015. Production of large Ries studio work has ceased and is not expected to resume. His private studio in Tunkhannock, Pennsylvania is still operational.

Artwork 
 Ries's sculptures are noted for their changing internal optical compositions and technical proficiency. Ries's primary medium is clear lead crystal, a glass with an unusually high refractive index, extreme light transmission in the visual range, and outstanding homogeneity. These qualities enable Ries to create the optical effects found within his work.

Ries begins with large blocks of optical glass and reduces them to the desired form by cutting, carving, grinding, and polishing them. His larger sculptures are taken from source material that can weigh over 4,000 pounds, and the process of reducing and polishing can take as much as a year.

Ries's Opus was at the time of its creation the world's largest monolithic glass sculpture. One of Ries's most famous works, the  Sunflower IV, took four months to anneal and required a further 1,800 estimated hours to carve.

Contemporary critics have noted Ries's unique ability to exploit glass's optical properties for artistic expression. James Yood, professor of contemporary art theory and criticism at Northwestern University, called Ries's work “an art of such suggestiveness and finesse, of ceaseless transition and surprise that it constitutes one of the most intriguing exercises in the poetics of optics anywhere in contemporary art.”

Ries himself characterizes his work as a “vessel for light,” noting that “all that we know about the universe, the composition of the stars, and the distances within the universe is studied through light...It is the one medium that gathers, focuses, amplifies, transmits, filters, diffuses and reflects it. It is the quintessential medium for light. I see it all on a symbolic level.”

Gallery

Awards and honors
 Ries's works have won numerous awards and are exhibited in major collections and museums throughout the United States, Europe, and Japan, including the Corning Museum of Glass, the Cincinnati Art Museum, the National Heisey Glass Museum, the National Liberty Museum, the Cleveland Museum of Art, and the Tampa Museum of Art. Among the awards and honors he has received are the:

2010 Doctor of Humane Letters honorary degree, Misericordia University, Dallas, Pennsylvania
2005 Artist as Hero, National Liberty Museum, Philadelphia, Pennsylvania
Distinguished Artist Award, University of the Arts, Philadelphia, Pennsylvania
1990 Ohioana Citation for Distinguished Service to Ohio in the Field of Art
1978–79 Aid to Individual Artists Fellowship, Ohio Arts Council
1974–75 Leo Yassenoff Scholarship

Permanent collections

United States
 Arizona
 University of Arizona, Tucson
 Florida
 Tampa Museum of Art, Tampa
 University of Central Florida, Orlando
Indiana
Indianapolis Museum of Art, Indianapolis
Louisiana
New Orleans Museum of Art, New Orleans
Minnesota
Mayo Clinic, Rochester
New Mexico
Wilford Gallery, Santa Fe
Lannan Foundation, Santa Fe
New Jersey
Museum of American Glass, Millville
New York
Corning Museum of Glass, Corning
Ohio
Riverside Medical Hospital, Columbus
Port Columbus International Airport, Columbus
Columbus Museum of Art, Columbus
American Ceramic Society, Westerville
Toledo Museum of Art, Toledo
Pennsylvania
National Liberty Museum, Philadelphia
Everhart Museum, Scranton
Governor's residence, Harrisburg

References

 Briggs, Richard. "Windows to a View: The Work of Glass Sculptor Christopher Ries," WVIA-TV, Northeastern Pennsylvania Public Television, Scranton, PA (November 1993).
 Kapelke, Steven. "Focus: Christopher Ries," American Craft (December 1996/January 1997).
 Paine, Janice T. "Clearly Inspired: Contemporary Glass and its Origins," American Craft (October/November 1999).
 Waggoner, Shawn. "The Fourth Dimension: The Art Glass of Christopher Ries," Glass Art (November/December 1996).

External links
Christopher Ries' site
Gallery of Christopher Ries Glass Sculptures

1952 births
20th-century American sculptors
American glass artists
Ohio State University alumni
People from Wyoming County, Pennsylvania
Living people
Articles containing video clips
21st-century American sculptors